Lyle is a city in Mower County, Minnesota, United States. The city lies within a mile of the Iowa border, which also is its southern city limit. Lyle Township adjoins the city on its east, north, and west sides. The population was 551 at the 2010 census.

Geography

Demographics

2010 census
As of the census of 2010, there were 551 people, 220 households, and 147 families residing in the city. The racial makeup of the city was 98.2% White, 0.2% Native American, 0.2% from other races, and 1.5% from two or more races. Hispanic or Latino of any race were 0.7% of the population.

There were 220 households, of which 33.6% had children under the age of 18 living with them, 51.8% were married couples living together, 11.8% had a female householder with no husband present, 3.2% had a male householder with no wife present, and 33.2% were non-families. 30.5% of all households were made up of individuals, and 16% had someone living alone who was 65 years of age or older. The average household size was 2.50 and the average family size was 3.06.

The median age in the city was 36.3 years. 27.2% of residents were under the age of 18; 8.4% were between the ages of 18 and 24; 23.6% were from 25 to 44; 26.1% were from 45 to 64; and 14.7% were 65 years of age or older. The gender makeup of the city was 48.3% male and 51.7% female.

2000 census
As of the census of 2000, there were 566 people, 211 households, and 148 families residing in the city. The racial makeup of the city was 99.82% White and 0.18% Native American. Hispanic or Latino of any race were 0.35% of the population.

There were 211 households, out of which 37.9% had children under the age of 18 living with them, 59.7% were married couples living together, 8.1% had a female householder with no husband present, and 29.4% were non-families. 25.6% of all households were made up of individuals, and 13.3% had someone living alone who was 65 years of age or older.  The average household size was 2.68 and the average family size was 3.26.

In the city, the population was spread out, with 30.0% under the age of 18, 6.7% from 18 to 24, 30.6% from 25 to 44, 17.0% from 45 to 64, and 15.7% who were 65 years of age or older.  The median age was 37 years. For every 100 females, there were 96.5 males.  For every 100 females age 18 and over, there were 96.0 males.

The median income for a household in the city was $34,464, and the median income for a family was $42,500. Males had a median income of $30,938 versus $24,107 for females. The per capita income for the city was $14,624.  About 4.2% of families and 9.4% of the population were below the poverty line, including 9.4% of those under age 18 and 11.0% of those age 65 or over.

School 
Lyle Independent School District #497 serves both the city of Lyle and the surrounding farm community.

This district is merged for purposes of athletics with Austin Pacelli, a Catholic high school in Austin, Minnesota. Lyle sports teams, formerly the Lyle Lions, are now the Lyle-Pacelli Athletics. Since the district is so small, Lyle-Pacelli frequently plays against schools with much larger enrollments and plays nine-man football.

The Lyle area was engaged in a bitter fight over a school bond referendum from 2002 to 2005. Two groups emerged in the community: "Save our Schools and Community", a group supporting construction of a new school, and "Concerned Citizens for Lyle's Future", a group opposing the construction of a new school in favor of other less expensive solutions. In 2005, Concerned Citizens for Lyle's Future hired an anti-school-bond consultant from Ocheyedan, Iowa. The bond passed on May 24, 2005, by a vote of 449 to 343. In this election, 98% of eligible voters participated. The new school has been built on the site of the former facility.

History 
Lyle was platted in 1870. The city was named after Robert Lyle, a farmer, territorial, and state legislator. Lyle was incorporated in 1875.

Media 

Lyle-area news is covered by the following local media organizations:

Newspaper 
 Austin Daily Herald
 Rochester Post-Bulletin - Austin Edition

Television 
 KAAL - ABC
 KTTC - NBC
 KIMT - CBS
 KSMQ - PBS (public)
 KYIN - PBS (public)

Radio (FM)

 KQPR 96.1 FM
 KRCH 101.7 FM
 KROC 106.9 FM
 The Blaze 102.7 FM

Radio (AM) 

 KNFX 970 AM
 KWEB 1270 AM
 KROC 1340 AM
 KATE 1450 AM
 KAUS 1480 AM

References

Further reading

External links

City of Lyle
Lyle Historical Society
Lyle Public School

Cities in Minnesota
Cities in Mower County, Minnesota